Coelomera is a genus of beetles belonging to the family Chrysomelidae.

The species of this genus are found in Central and South America.

Species:

Coelomera atrocaerulea 
Coelomera azureofasciata 
Coelomera bajula 
Coelomera basalis 
Coelomera binotata 
Coelomera bipustulata 
Coelomera boliviensis 
Coelomera buckleyi 
Coelomera cajennensis 
Coelomera cinxia 
Coelomera depressa 
Coelomera godmani 
Coelomera jacobyi 
Coelomera janthinipennis 
Coelomera lanio 
Coelomera lanio laeta 
Coelomera lanio lanio 
Coelomera maculicollis 
Coelomera nigricollis 
Coelomera olivieri 
Coelomera opaca 
Coelomera punctaticollis 
Coelomera raquia 
Coelomera ruficollis 
Coelomera ruficornis 
Coelomera ruficornis amazonica 
Coelomera ruficornis ruficornis 
Coelomera rufofusca 
Coelomera submetallica 
Coelomera tenuicornis 
Coelomera tibialis 
Coelomera weyrauchi

References

Galerucinae
Chrysomelidae genera
Taxa named by Louis Alexandre Auguste Chevrolat